Jennifer Aaker (born January 15, 1967, California) is an American behavioural scientist and General Atlantic Professor and Coulter Family Fellow at the Stanford Graduate School of Business. She is known for her research on time, money, and happiness. Aaker also focuses on the transmission of ideas through social networks, the power of story in decision making, and how to build global brands across cultures. She is the recipient of the Distinguished Scientific Achievement Award from the Society for Consumer Psychology and the Stanford Distinguished Teaching Award.

Early life and education 
Aaker was born in Palo Alto, California to Kay Aaker and David Aaker, a professor and brand consultant. Aaker attended the University of California, Berkeley, where she studied under social psychologist Philip E. Tetlock and Nobel Prize winner Daniel Kahneman, receiving a Bachelor of Arts in Psychology in 1989. In 1990, Aaker began postgraduate work at Stanford Graduate School of Business, earning a PhD in marketing with a minor in psychology in 1995. Her dissertation on brand personality led to the publication of academic papers in Journal of Marketing Research and Journal of Consumer Research.

Career 
Aaker began her academic career in 1995 as an assistant professor at the UCLA Anderson School of Management. In 1999, she returned to the Stanford Graduate School of Business (GSB) as an assistant professor, was promoted to associate professor in 2001, and earned a full professorship in 2004. In 2005, Aaker was named General Atlantic Professor and Coulter Family Fellow, Stanford GSB. Her work has been published in scholarly journals in psychology and marketing and has been highlighted in The Economist, The New York Times, The Wall Street Journal, The Washington Post, BusinessWeek, Forbes, NPR, CBS MoneyWatch, Inc., and Science. She serves as an advisory board member for several private and public companies.

In 2010, Aaker and her husband, startup advisor Andy Smith, wrote The Dragonfly Effect: Quick, Effective and Powerful Ways to Use Social Media to Drive Social Change.

In a real world demonstration of the Dragonfly Effect, Aaker and her students founded 100K Cheeks, an organization dedicated to registering 100,000 South Asian donors in the National Bone Marrow Registry. In addition to using social networks, Aaker ran the first ever cheek swab in India. As a result of these efforts, 100K Cheeks exceeded their goal by registering more than 115,000 potential donors.

In 2021, Aaker published Humor, Seriously: Why Humor Is A Secret Weapon in Business and Life with co-author Naomi Bagdonas.

Books

Selected publications 
 
 
 
 
How Happiness Impacts Choice (2012), Mogilner, Aaker and Kamvar, JCR
Awe Expands People's Perception of Time and Enhances Well-Being (2012), Rudd, Vohs, and Aaker, Psychological Science.
If Money Doesn't Make You Happy, Consider Time (2011), Aaker, Rudd, and Mogilner, JCP
The Shifting Meaning of Happiness (2010) Mogilner, Kamvar and Aaker, SPPS
Non-Profits Are Seen as Warm and For-Profits as Competent (2010), Aaker, Vohs and Mogilner, JCR
The Time versus Money Effect (2009), Mogilner and Aaker, JCR
The Happiness of Giving: The Time-Ask Effect (2008), Liu and Aaker, JCR
When Good Brands Do Bad (2004), Aaker, Fournier, and Brasel, JCR
Can Mixed Emotions Peacefully Co-Exist? (2002), Williams and Aaker, JCR
Consumption Symbols as Carriers of Culture (2001), Aaker, Benet-Martínez, and Garolera, JPSP
Dimensions of Brand Personality (1997), Aaker, JMR

See also
 Design thinking
 Customer engagement

References

External links 
Jennifer Aaker at Stanford Graduate School of Business
Building Innovative Brands
The Power of Story
Designing (for) Happiness
The Dragonfly Effect

1967 births
Living people
American social psychologists
American marketing people
Stanford Graduate School of Business alumni
Stanford University Graduate School of Business faculty
Marketing theorists
Marketing women
People from Lafayette, California
Writers from Palo Alto, California